Mila District is a district of Mila Province, Algeria.

The district is further divided into 3 municipalities:
Mila
Aïn Tine
Sidi Khelifa

Districts of Mila Province